The 1987 UEFA Cup Final was a football tie played on 6 and 20 May 1987 between IFK Göteborg of Sweden and Dundee United of Scotland. Göteborg won 2–1 on aggregate, their second UEFA Cup triumph, following victory in 1982. It was Dundee United's first, and so far only, major European final.

Route to the final

Match details

First leg

Second leg

See also
1986–87 UEFA Cup
Dundee United F.C. in European football
IFK Göteborg in European football

References
General

RSSSF - UEFA Cup 1986-87
RSSSF - IFK in Europe 1981-1995

Specific

2
UEFA Cup Final
UEFA Cup Final 1987
UEFA Cup Final 1987
UEFA Cup Finals
International club association football competitions hosted by Scotland
International club association football competitions hosted by Sweden
UEFA Cup Final
UEFA Cup final 1987
UEFA Cup Final
UEFA Cup Final
1980s in Gothenburg
International sports competitions in Gothenburg
Football in Dundee